Miše is a surname that may refer to:

 Ante Miše (born 1967), Croatian footballer 
 Jerolim Miše (1890–1970), Croatian painter, teacher, and art critic

MISE may refer to:

 Mean integrated squared error

See also 
 Mise en abyme
 Mise en place
 Mise-en-scène